Valerie Compton (born 1963) is a Canadian writer and journalist. Compton grew up in Bangor, Prince Edward Island and studied at the University of King's College. She has lived in Edmonton, Calgary, and Rothesay, New Brunswick. Compton has been writing short fiction  for over twenty years, has written one novel, writes nonfiction articles, and works as a freelance editor and mentor to emerging writers. She now lives in Halifax, Nova Scotia.

Writing 

Author of the novel Tide Road (Goose Lane Editions, 2011) which was named a best book of 2011 by the Telegraph-Journal.

Compton's short fiction has been published in The Malahat Review, The New Quarterly, Riddle Fence, Grain, echolocation, Room, The Dalhousie Review, The Antigonish Review and the anthology Riptides: New Island Fiction.

Her nonfiction articles and reviews have been published in The Globe and Mail, The National Post, The Ottawa Citizen, Gourmet, The Edmonton Journal, The Calgary Herald, Quill & Quire, and The Winnipeg Review, among other periodicals.

Awards 

Tide Road was a finalist for the 2012 Thomas Head Raddall Atlantic Fiction Award.

Compton has been shortlisted twice for the CBC Literary Awards and has an Island Literary Award for Bluebird People in 2006.

References

External links 

 2012 Novella Prize Judge Valerie Compton in Conversation with Tyler Laing
 Winnipeg Review | Review of Tide Road by Valerie Compton

Canadian women novelists
1963 births
Writers from Prince Edward Island
Living people
People from Kings County, Prince Edward Island
21st-century Canadian novelists
21st-century Canadian women writers